Dowlatabad Rural District is a rural district (dehestan) in the Central District of Ravansar County, Kermanshah Province, Iran. At the 2006 census, its population was 4,015, in 834 families. The rural district has 30 villages.

References 

Rural Districts of Kermanshah Province
Ravansar County